A natural monument is a natural or natural/cultural feature of outstanding or unique value because of its inherent rarity, representative of aesthetic qualities or cultural significance. 

Under World Commission on Protected Areas guidelines, natural monuments are level III, described as:
"Areas are set aside to protect a specific natural monument, which can be a landform, sea mount, submarine cavern, geological feature such as a cave or even a living feature such as an ancient grove. They are generally quite small protected areas and often have high visitor value."
This is a lower level of protection than level II (national parks) and level I (wilderness areas).

The European Environment Agency's guidelines for selection of a natural monument are:
 The area should contain one or more features of outstanding significance. Appropriate natural features include waterfalls, caves, craters, fossil beds, sand dunes and marine features, along with unique or representative fauna and flora; associated cultural features might include cave dwellings, cliff-top forts, archaeological sites, or natural sites which have heritage significance to indigenous peoples.
 The area should be large enough to protect the integrity of the feature and its immediately related surroundings.

See also
IUCN Protected Area Management Categories: Category III Natural Monument or Feature
U.S. National Monument
World Conservation Union

References

External links

A-Z of Areas of Biodiversity Importance: Natural Monument or Feature
Natural Monuments in Brazil

 
Outdoor sculptures
Open-air museums
Types of monuments and memorials
Protected areas